Niskai is a term used to refer to any of the water spirits and goddesses in Celtic mythology. Niskai are also considered goddesses in Neo-Paganism.

Sources

Modern pagan beliefs and practices
Celtic mythology
Celtic goddesses